Dharshan Munidasa (born 9 November 1970) is a Sri Lankan chef, restaurateur and television personality. He founded Nihonbashi and the Ministry of Crab, two of Sri Lanka’s most successful restaurants, both of which are the only Sri Lankan restaurants on Asia's 50 Best Restaurants List. He was the host of the popular TV series Culinary Journeys with Dharshan.

Munidasa is a self-taught culinary expert, who prides himself on the fact that he never attended culinary school. His efforts in promoting Japanese Cuisine in Sri Lanka earned him recognition from the Japanese Government for which he was awarded The Minister’s Award for Overseas Promotion of Japanese Food for the year 2014.

Early life and education 
Dharshan Munidasa was born in Tokyo, Japan to a Japanese mother, Nobuko Munidasa and Sri Lankan father, Dr. Milton Munidasa and spent most of his childhood in Japan, where his earliest experiments in cooking were upon observing his mother and Japanese aunts in the kitchen. He is the eldest of three children; he has a younger brother, Kanishka and a younger sister, Dulee.

After completing his primary and secondary education at St. Joseph's College, Colombo and Wycherley International School, Munidasa went on to graduate with a Double Degree in Computer Engineering and International Relations from The Johns Hopkins University, USA in 1994. It was as a university student that he unearthed his passion for cooking - out of necessity - as he found the commercial cafeteria food uninspiring.

Career 

Munidasa returned to the island in 1994, following the death of his father, where the lack of authentic Japanese food in the country, combined with his heritage and passion for pure Japanese culinary fare motivated Munidasa, who had never had any formal culinary training, to open his maiden venture Nihonbashi (meaning "Japan Bridge") in 1995 at Galle Face Terrace.

Subsequently, he went on to open two more branches of Nihonbashi at Odel, Alexandra Place in 2001 for on-the-go dining and then at Hilton Colombo Residencies in 2002, specializing in tempura. Munidasa has also been invited to prepare Japanese degustation dinners at various establishments in South Asia; including The Conrad, The Four Seasons, Hilton, Huvafen Fushi and the Six Senses properties, all in the Maldives and for the International Wine and Food Society in Mumbai.

In December 2011, Munidasa in collaboration with close friends, Sri Lankan Cricketing Legends Mahela Jayawardene and Kumar Sangakkara opened Ministry of Crab, housed in the recently refurbished 400-year-old ‘Old Dutch Hospital’ Shopping Precinct. This restaurant has the distinction of being one of the first in the country dedicated to serving the freshest export quality lagoon crabs.

In 2011, Nihonbashi became one of only two Sri Lankan restaurants selected to be featured in the 2011/2012 edition of The Miele Guide (Asia’s first independent restaurant guide). In their 2013 Edition, Munidasa had the privilege of gaining both the coveted first and second place in Sri Lanka for the outstanding cuisine at both the Ministry of Crab and Nihonbashi, respectively.

Nihonbashi also earned the prestige of being the first Sri Lankan restaurant to make it onto Asia’s 50 Best Restaurants List and ranked consecutively on it from 2013 to 2018, Ministry of Crab also had the honour of being ranked on this prestigious list from 2015 to 2020. Further, in the 2016 edition of this list, Ministry of Crab took the title of The S. Pellegrino Best Restaurant in Sri Lanka, title it continues to hold to date. As of 2022, Ministry of Crab sits at no. 35 on the Asia’s 50 Best Restaurants List.(https://www.theworlds50best.com/asia/en/the-list/31-40/ministry-of-crab.html Asia's 50 Best Restaurants)

As recognition for his contribution to Japanese Culture, Munidasa was awarded the Japanese Ambassador's Special Commendation by the Japanese Embassy in Sri Lanka, in December 2013. Dharshan was also recognized by the Japanese government when he was awarded The Minister’s Award for Overseas Promotion of Japanese Food for the year 2014, becoming one of the five people in the world to be given this prestigious award that year.

In July 2014, Munidasa opened his third restaurant Kaema Sutra, in partnership with Bollywood Actress Jacqueline Fernandez, plating up contemporary Sri Lankan cuisine. 

In November 2014, Munidasa also opened The Tuna & The Crab at Dutch Hospital in Galle Fort in the South of Sri Lanka.The restaurant features a combination of flavours from his two flagship restaurants Nihonbashi and Ministry of Crab, as well as original dishes. This was his first restaurant venture outside the capital city of Colombo.

Dharshan also launched his own green juice which utilizes Gotukola as its primary ingredient.  Gotukola juices and the various methods of preparation have been a part of tradition for a long time in Sri Lanka. Dharshan's Gotukola drink is named Centella after its scientific name, and contains no water and no added sugars or sweeteners.

In 2017, Munidasa was awarded the Business Today Passionate Award, which recognized pioneering individuals, who single-handedly created novel concepts and succeeded in making them a reality and who have driven the economy of Sri Lanka in the same manner as the corporate sector. 

Munidasa expanded Ministry of Crab on an international level by opening the first overseas restaurant in Shanghai at the People's Park in October 2018. In 2019, Ministry of Crab opened four more restaurants - Ministry Crab Manila at Shangri-La, at the Fort Hotel in January, Ministry of Crab Mumbai at the Zaveri House in Khar in February, Ministry of Crab Maldives at the Marina @ CROSSROADS in October and Ministry of Crab Bangkok in Sukhumvit Soi - 31 in December. 

His restaurant Nihonbashi has also extended to Kandy, with the establishment of Café Nihonbashi at the Radh Hotel in Kandy in 2018, as well as Nihonbashi Blue in the Maldives which opened in January 2020 (also at The Marina @ CROSSROADS). 

Dharshan’s newest venture is Carne Diem at The Marina @ CROSSROADS in the Maldives, a steak restaurant in collaboration with acclaimed hotelier Renato Chizzola, Former VP Operations Asia/Middle East for Cheval Blanc and GM of Cheval Blanc Randheli. Opened in 2020, this innovative concept focuses on a unique charcoal grill created by Munidasa himself, that finishes a steak at a temperature of 750 ˚C. Carne Diem also uses cast iron pans that handle this high temperature to create the now-famous beef crackling.

Television 

Munidasa made his first television appearance in 2009 on the Sri Lanka episode of Rick Stein's Far East Odyssey on BBC.

In 2010, Munidasa paired up with leading English channel ETV to co-produce and host "Culinary Journeys with Dharshan", a culinary travelogue that took viewers a step forward beyond an ordinary culinary experience, to places far and wide in search of the best sources for the finest ingredients in Sri Lankan and Japanese cuisine. The show which was mainly filmed in Sri Lanka and Japan ran for two seasons until 2011. An episode of this show which was filmed in Singapore around the famous Chilli Crab made with exported Sri Lankan mud crab, was consequently what inspired Munidasa to open a restaurant which pays homage to the Sri Lankan mud crab in their home country.

Munidasa was one of five chefs and the first non-Japanese chef featured on season two of Nippon Shokudo for TV Tokyo in 2011. The episode focused on Nihonbashi Restaurant and Japanese Cuisine in Sri Lanka.

In 2017, he appeared Season 10's episode 6 of Anthony Bourdain: Parts Unknown airing on CNN.

Affiliations 

In 2014, Munidasa was named as a Cool Japan Ambassador by the Japanese Government for his work towards the promotion of Japanese cuisine outside of Japan.

Personal life 

Munidasa has one child, a daughter, named Shanaia born in 1996.

References

External links 
 Nihonbashi Japanese Restaurants Official Website
 Ministry of Crab Official Website
 Kaema Sutra Official Website

1970 births
Living people
Sri Lankan chefs